The Civic Platform presidential primary, 2010 was the first presidential primary open to all party members in Polish history. The primary was organized by the governing centre-right party following the decision by party chairman and Prime Minister Donald Tusk not to run for president again (he lost in a runoff to incumbent Lech Kaczyński in 2005). Prior to his withdrawal, Tusk was thought to be the presumptive nominee.

The vote lasted from March 18 to March 25. Results were announced on March 27.

Candidates

Results

Turnout was 47.5 percent, or more than 21,000 of the total party members. The vote was conducted entirely through internet and post ballots. Komorowski won handily and went on to win the general election in July over Jarosław Kaczyński.

 Bronisław Komorowski: 68.5%
 Radosław Sikorski: 31.5%

See also
2010 Polish presidential election

References

External links
 Polish Party Picks Anticommunist Activist for Presidential Run
  Wybory 2010. Bronisław Komorowski kandydatem PO na prezydenta

2010 elections in Poland
Primary elections in Poland
Civic Platform
2010 Polish presidential election